Ivan Dmitryevich Kosogov (1891 – 1 August 1938) was a Soviet Komkor (corps commander). He fought on the side of the Bolsheviks against the White movement during the Russian Civil War. He was a recipient of the Order of the Red Banner. During the Great Purge, he was arrested in 1937 and executed the following year at the Kommunarka shooting ground.

References

Bibliography

External links 
 Репрессии в Красной Армии

1891 births
1938 deaths
Soviet komkors
Soviet military personnel of the Russian Civil War
Recipients of the Order of the Red Banner
Great Purge victims from Russia
People executed by the Soviet Union